The eighth season of Smallville, an American television series, began airing on September 18, 2008. The series recounts the early adventures of Kryptonian Clark Kent as he adjusts to life in the fictional town of Smallville, Kansas, during the years before he becomes Superman. The eighth season comprises 22 episodes and concluded its initial airing on May 14, 2009, marking the third season to air on The CW television network. Regular cast members during season eight include Tom Welling, Allison Mack, Erica Durance, Aaron Ashmore, along with new series regulars Cassidy Freeman, Sam Witwer, and Justin Hartley.

This season focuses on Clark Kent as he starts his job at the Daily Planet, begins to accept more of his destiny as Earth's hero, and develops romantic feelings for Lois Lane. While Lex Luthor is presumed dead, and Lana Lang has left Smallville for good, Clark also meets new characters Davis Bloome, Smallvilles interpretation of Doomsday, as well as the new CEO of LuthorCorp, Tess Mercer. In other storylines, Clark and Oliver Queen clash over how to handle Lex when he resurfaces, while Chloe Sullivan and Jimmy Olsen take their relationship to the next level. In addition, this season sees the appearance of more DC Comics characters, including recurring appearances from Plastique and members of the Legion of Super-Heroes.

Following the end of season seven, it was announced that series regulars Kristin Kreuk and Michael Rosenbaum, who had been with the show since the first episode, would not return as regulars for the eighth season, though Kreuk did return as a recurring guest to conclude her story. Laura Vandervoort and John Glover departed the series alongside Kreuk and Rosenbaum; Glover was killed off in season seven's "Descent", while Vandervoort was written out of the series after one season but made one guest appearance in this season. Show creators Alfred Gough and Miles Millar also departed the series, allowing Kelly Souders, Brian Peterson, Todd Slavkin and Darren Swimmer to continue as executive producers. This allowed the show to "reinvigorate" itself by introducing new characters and storylines, as well as developing Clark's understanding of his destiny.

Averaging 3.74 million viewers per episode, the season out-ranked other high-profile shows on the network, such as Reaper and Gossip Girl. It also received an Emmy Award nomination in the Sound Editing for a Series category.

Episodes

Production

Writing
Executive producer Kelly Souders explained that the loss of show creators Alfred Gough and Miles Millar, as well as series regulars Michael Rosenbaum and Kristin Kreuk at the end of the seventh season, forced the creative team to look at the show from a new angle. As Souders explained, it allowed the writers to work with "blank slates", and come up with ways to "reinvigorate and reinvent the show". Executive producer Darren Swimmer explained that this season would feature Chloe's powers manifesting in a way that they have not previously been seen. He went on to express that the theme of season eight would be "double identity"; specifically, Swimmer explained that Clark would begin to understand that he is going to have to live a double life, or he will never be able to continue forward with his destiny. Season eight would be about Clark moving forward to his destiny in a way that the show has never attempted before. Swimmer further explained that Clark will be acting more with his superpowers, whereas previously he would "react" to the situation; "he's going to seek out trouble." Clark joined the Daily Planet to help his cause, using the Planet as a means to get information about where there is trouble. Clark's heroic actions put him in Jimmy's sights, who starts connecting things to Clark; this helped fuel Clark's decision to develop a "secret identity". Another reason for Clark's decision to develop a secret identity will be the stark contrast between saving people in the secluded streets of Smallville, and saving people in the crowded streets of Metropolis. While working at the Daily Planet, Clark was paired up with Lois on various assignments. Lois Lane actress Erica Durance, explained the episodes would be more focused on her character than they have been in the past, and that Lois and Clark would be both rivals and supportive partners to each other. Durance also revealed that Lois would begin to realize her true romantic feelings for Clark, but that she does not want him to know the truth because she does not know what she wants to do with those feelings. Season eight explored these romantic notions between the two characters. Jeph Loeb added that season eight would explore more of the DC Comics mythology, and would introduce new characters, as well as expand on already existing ones in Smallville continuity. Peterson also revealed that there would be a chance that the show would break the "No flights, no tights" rule, at least in regard to the flying part of the rule.

With Justin Hartley added as a series regular, Smallville would explore more of his backstory, including why he chose to become Green Arrow, how he accomplished it, and how he became good at archery. This season would also explore more of the friendship between Oliver Queen and Clark. Oliver would be broken down emotionally—questioning whether he made the right choice to sacrifice all for the sake of being Green Arrow—and that causes him to "butt heads" with Clark, who is beginning to embrace his destiny. Allison Mack's character, Chloe Sullivan, would have more romantic interests this season. Not only would the character still have Jimmy Olsen, but there is still the question of her romantic interest in Clark, as well as a new interest in the character of Davis Bloome. Mack's character would also be picking up the Isis Foundation, a counseling center for people infected by kryptonite, that Lana founded before she left Smallville. Mack explained that Chloe would be forging her own destiny this season, and letting Clark learn to deal with problems on his own—previous seasons saw Clark relying heavily on Chloe to help solve the crime.

Characters
Brian Wayne Peterson and Todd Slavkin revealed that they planned to introduce more DC Comics characters into Smallville this season. Among those appearing were Plastique and Maxima, the latter coming to Smallville to try to mate with Clark. This version of Maxima had the ability to make herself irresistible to men, including Clark, whom she set her sights on; actress Charlotte Sullivan was cast as Maxima. Smallville also introduced the futuristic heroes from the Legion of Super-Heroes. Comic book scribe Geoff Johns wrote the episode that featured the Legion of Super-Heroes, and suggested that people familiar with the Legion would recognize them when they appeared on the show, as they had some of the quintessential elements of their comic book counterparts. Darren Swimmer stated that they would be using Saturn Girl, Cosmic Boy and Lightning Lad for this episode. In the seventeenth episode, "Hex", Smallville puts its spin on the DC character Zatanna. Portrayed by Serinda Swan, Zatanna is a magician who comes to town and grants Chloe a birthday wish that results in Chloe's body transforming into Lois. In an interview, writer Bryan Q. Miller explains that he read through archived comics featuring the Zatanna character, but was more influenced by Grant Morrison’s writing turn on Seven Soldiers, as well as the television episodes of Batman: The Animated Series and Justice League Unlimited that Zatanna made appearances on. Swan won the role of Zatanna after "acing" her audition thanks to the actress recording Zatanna's spells into her iPod and studying them in reverse—to cast a spell Zatanna recites the words in reverse.

There are two new characters added to the show as series regulars, Tess Mercer and Davis Bloome. The name "Tess Mercer" is a homage to two characters from Superman lore, Eve Teschmacher and Mercy Graves. As Freeman describes her character, Tess Mercer is Lex's handpicked successor; she is "fierce", "fun" and intelligent. Tess Mercer's primary goal for this season was finding Lex, which drew her inquisitively to Clark, who she believed would be able to help her. Darren Swimmer revealed that Tess would develop a romantic interest in Clark as well. Davis Bloome would actually be Smallvilles interpretation of Doomsday, the only character to have succeeded at killing Superman. In Smallville, Doomsday was represented by a "nice guy" paramedic, who grew up moving from foster home to foster home. His storyline was very dark in that the character would uncover horrible truths about himself. Witwer explained that over the course of the season, his character would come to resemble that of the comic book counterpart he is based on. Brian Peterson explained that the new executive producers were looking for a villainous character that was "as great as Lex", with Michael Rosenbaum's departure, and Doomsday fit what they were looking for.

Reception
Season eight finished 152 out of the 190 shows ranked in the Nielsen ratings, averaging 3.74 million viewers a week. ''Smallvilles eighth season received an Emmy Award nomination in the Sound Editing for a Series category. In the 2009 Teen Choice Awards, Tom Welling received the award for Choice TV Actor – Action Adventure.

The season eight DVD box set was officially released on August 25, 2009, and sold approximately 183,000 units in its first week; it generated an estimated $6.7 million. Comparatively, the DVD revenue decreased from the previous year, with the season seven box set having sold over 212,000 units and generating an estimated $8 million during its first week. Regardless, it was enough for Smallville to earn second place in most units sold during the ending week of August 30, 2009, just behind the season five boxset of House which sold approximately 223,000 units. Even though House sold more units, Smallvilles $6.7 million in revenue was more than Houses $6.0 million, making it the top money earner for the week. In its second week, the eighth season only sold 55,000 units, and earning more than $2 million. The third week of release saw another dip in sales, with the season eight boxset only selling 30,000 units. At the same time, the end of week three brought the season eight sales past the $10 million mark.

 Home media release 
The complete eighth season of Smallville was released on August 25, 2009 in North America in both DVD and Blu-ray format. The DVD and Blu-ray box set were also released in region 2 and region 4 on October 12, 2009 and March 31, 2010, respectively. The box set included various special features, including episode commentary, a behind-the-scenes featurettes titled "Smallville'''s Doomsday: The Making of a Monster" and "In the Director’s Chair: Behind the Lens and Calling the Shots with Allison Mack".

References

External links

 
 
 List of Smallville season 8 episodes at Wikia
 
 List of Smallville season 8 guide at kryptonsite.com

8
2008 American television seasons
2009 American television seasons